Fly Aruba was an airline company based in Aruba. Formed in 2010, the company had filed for bankruptcy by June 2012 after failing to receive regulatory permission to fly and not paying salaries to its local workers.

References

Defunct airlines of Aruba
2010 establishments in Aruba
2012 disestablishments in Aruba
Airlines established in 2010
Airlines disestablished in 2012